Giacomo Beretta (born 14 March 1992) is an Italian professional footballer who plays as a forward for  club Foggia.

Club career

Early years 
Beretta joined Milan in the summer of 2009, in a co-ownership deal with his former club AlbinoLeffe for €900,000. He spent the season playing for Milan's under-20 side, who won the Coppa Italia Primavera 25 years after the team's last success in the competition, although he missed several games throughout the year due to injury.

Milan (2010–11) 
At the beginning of the 2010–11 season, Beretta's playing rights were fully purchased by Milan for a fee of €1M. However, half of them were subsequently sold for €4M to Genoa in a new co-ownership deal on 23 August, with Milan keeping the actual use of the player for the season thanks to a loan deal. The then 18-year-old forward kept playing for the under-20 team, but also made his official first team debut on 1 May 2011, in a Serie A game against Bologna.

Ascoli and Juve Stabia (2011–12) 
For the 2011–12 season, Beretta's co-ownership between Milan and Genoa was renewed, but he was loaned out to Serie B side Ascoli. Beretta made up a total of 15 appearances (13 in the league and two in 2011–12 Coppa Italia) and one goal, before moving to Juve Stabia during the January transfer window.

Pavia (2012–13) 
For the 2012–13 season Beretta was loaned out to Prima Divisione club Pavia.

Lecce (2013–14) 
At the start of the 2013–14 campaign, Milan bought back Beretta for €2 million. However, he was loaned out to Lega Pro Prima Divisione club Lecce.

Pro Vercelli (2014–2016) 
For the 2014–15 season he was loaned out again, this time to Pro Vercelli. The deal was renewed for one more season in July 2015.

Virtus Entella (2016–17)
On 24 August 2016 Beretta joined Virtus Entella in another loan.

Foggia
On 26 July 2017 Serie B Foggia signed Beretta from Milan in a definitive deal on a two-year player contract.

Return to Ascoli
On 21 July 2018, he returned to Ascoli, signing a 3-year contract. On 2 October 2020 his contract was terminated by mutual consent.

Padova
On 22 October 2020 he signed with Serie C side Padova.

Cittadella
On 1 February 2021 he moved to Serie B club Cittadella.

Return to Foggia
On 13 January 2023, Beretta signed a 2.5-year contract with Foggia.

International career 
Beretta won 15 caps and scored 10 goals for Italy U-17 in 2009. He scored 3 goals in all 3 matches of 2009 UEFA European Under-17 Football Championship elite qualification. In the final tournament he scored once in 4 appearances. He was also part of the squad that took part in the 2009 FIFA U-17 World Cup, making 4 appearances and scoring a goal in the tournament (against United States).

Beretta went on to be capped for Italy U-19, winning 7 caps and scoring one goal between 2010 and 2011, as well as featuring in 15 games for the U-20 side from 2010 to 2014.

Honours

Milan 
Serie A: 1
 2010–11

References

External links 
 Profile at Assocalciatori.it 
 International caps  at FIGC.it 
 

Living people
1992 births
Footballers from Lombardy
Sportspeople from Varese
Association football forwards
Italian footballers
Italy youth international footballers
U.C. AlbinoLeffe players
A.C. Milan players
Ascoli Calcio 1898 F.C. players
S.S. Juve Stabia players
F.C. Pavia players
U.S. Lecce players
F.C. Pro Vercelli 1892 players
Virtus Entella players
A.C. Carpi players
Calcio Foggia 1920 players
Calcio Padova players
A.S. Cittadella players
Serie A players
Serie B players
Serie C players